Dufferin was a federal electoral district represented in the House of Commons of Canada from 1904 to 1925. It was located in the province of Ontario. This riding was created in 1903 from parts of Cardwell, Grey East, Simcoe South, Wellington Centre and Wellington North ridings.

It consisted of the county of Dufferin.

The electoral district was abolished in 1924 when it was merged with Simcoe South to create the new electoral district of Dufferin—Simcoe.

Election results

|}

|}

On Mr. Barr's death, 19 November 1909:

|}

|}

|}

|}

See also 

 List of Canadian federal electoral districts
 Past Canadian electoral districts

External links 
Riding history from the Library of Parliament

Former federal electoral districts of Ontario